Terrance Michael Boykin (born September 15, 1979), better known as Bump J, is an American rapper from Chicago managed by SAL&CO.

Career
Boykin was signed by Free4All/Atlantic Records on a three million dollar contract . In 2005, he released "Move Around", his only hit single, which received radio play and was included in Madden NFL 06 and Entourage (Season 2, Episode 7) as well as used in commercials for McDonald's.

He worked with Kanye West on his debut album Nothing to Lose but left the label in 2007 before the album was released.

In 2008 he was arrested on bank robbery charges for an armed robbery in January 2007. After accepting a plea deal and serving seven years of a ten year prison sentence, he was released on April 12, 2017.

After his release, he collaborated with Ty Money and Chicago rapper G Herbo on his debut album Humble Beast.

References 

1980 births
Living people
People from Chicago
Atlantic Records artists
21st-century American rappers